The Box is a 2003 American film noir starring James Russo, Theresa Russell, Brad Dourif, Steve Railsback, Jon Polito, Michael Rooker, John Snyder and directed by Richard Pepin.

Russo won the Best Actor Award at the San Diego Film Festival for his role in this film in 2004.

Plot
An ex-con trying to go straight meets up with a female co-worker who has attempted to start her life over after working as a prostitute.

References

Sources

http://www.shoestring.org/mmi_revs/box-ms-162814546.html
https://www.variety.com/profiles/Film/main/165191/The%20Box.html?dataSet=1
http://www.filmmonthly.com/Video/Articles/TheBox/TheBox.html

2003 films
Films directed by Richard Pepin
2000s English-language films